is an underground railway station on the Minatomirai Line in Nishi-ku, Yokohama, Kanagawa Prefecture, Japan, operated by the third-sector railway operating company Yokohama Minatomirai Railway.

Lines
Trains through-run to and from the Tokyu Toyoko Line from Shibuya Station and beyond on the Tokyo Metro Fukutoshin Line and Tobu Tojo Line and Seibu Ikebukuro Line.

Station layout

Minatomirai Station is an underground station with a single island platform serving two tracks. The station is located directly below the Queen's Square shopping complex.

Platforms

Chest-high platform-edge doors were installed on both sides of the platform by April 2018.

History
Minatomirai Station opened on 1 February 2004, coinciding with the opening of the Minatomirai Line.

Passenger statistics
In fiscal 2011, the station was used by an average of 60,056 passengers daily.

Surrounding area
Minato Mirai 21
Yokohama Landmark Tower
Pacifico Yokohama
Yokohama Museum of Art

See also
 List of railway stations in Japan

References

External links

  

Railway stations in Kanagawa Prefecture
Railway stations in Yokohama
Railway stations in Japan opened in 2004